The Redmond Hotel, at 15 E. Main St. in Redmond, Utah, was built in 1879.  It was listed on the National Register of Historic Places in 1980.

It was deemed "significant as a good example of a public boarding house in a rural, Mormon community. Based upon a comprehensive survey of Sevier County, it is the best example of this building type in the county. It is also an excellent example of structural adaptation of a building to local events for the 'hotel' has evolved as the community evolved. The Redmond Hotel stands today as one of the best remembered 'old hotels' in Sevier County."

References

Hotel buildings on the National Register of Historic Places in Utah
National Register of Historic Places in Sevier County, Utah
Buildings and structures completed in 1879